Utakata may refer to:

 Uta Kata, a 2004 anime television series
 Utakata (EP), an EP by Chara
 Utakata (song), a song by Pink Lady